Nike Hydac is the designation of an American sounding rocket with two stages, based upon the Nike Ajax booster. The Nike Hydac was launched 87 times from many missile sites. Such sites were White Sands Missile Range, Poker Flat Research Range ("Poker Flats"), Kwajalein Missile Range, Cassino Site - Rio Grande Airport, Brazil, and from North Truro Air Force Station in Massachusetts during Operation Have Horn in 1969. 

The directing agency for Nike Hydac was the Air Force Cambridge Research Laboratories, (AFCRL) Cambridge, Massachusetts. The AFCRL began its origins to the Cambridge Field Station in 1945 to analyze and study Massachusetts Institute of Technology (MIT) wartime efforts on electronic countermeasures and atmospheric research.

Nike platform
Section source: Astronautix
Type: two stage
Stage 1: Nike - solid propellant rocket stage, loaded/empty mass 599/256 kg
Stage 2: Hydac - solid propellant rocket stage, loaded mass 300 kg
Gross mass: 900 kg (1,980 lb) 
Height: 9.10 m (29.80 ft) 
Diameter: 0.42 m (1.37 ft) 
Thrust: 217.00 kN (48,783 lbf) 
Apogee: 150 km (90 mi)
First date: 1966-11-05 
Last date: 1983-06-16 
Number: 87 launches

Other Nike sounding rockets
Nike-Apache
Nike-Asp
Nike-Cajun
Nike-Deacon
Nike-Iroquois
Nike Javelin
Nike Malemute
Nike-Nike
Nike Orion
Nike Recruit
Nike T40 T55
Nike Tomahawk
Nike Viper

References

Nike (rocket family)